Yoshiharu Arino (born 15 August 1980) is a Japanese short track speed skater. He competed in the men's 5000 metre relay event at the 2006 Winter Olympics.

References

1980 births
Living people
Japanese male short track speed skaters
Olympic short track speed skaters of Japan
Short track speed skaters at the 2006 Winter Olympics
Sportspeople from Tokyo
Asian Games medalists in short track speed skating
Short track speed skaters at the 2003 Asian Winter Games
Medalists at the 2003 Asian Winter Games
Asian Games bronze medalists for Japan